The United States competed at the 2015 Pan American Games in Toronto, Canada, from July 10 to 26, 2015.

On July 6, 2015 the United States Olympic Committee announced the full squad of 623 athletes (331 men and 302 women) that will compete in 34 sports. The United States will not compete in both handball and football (soccer).

Sport shooter Kim Rhode was named the flagbearer of the team during the opening ceremony, after being selected by her teammates.

Medalists

The following U.S. competitors won medals at the games. In the by discipline sections below, medalists' names are bolded.

|style="text-align:left; width:78%; vertical-align:top;"|

|style="text-align:left; width:22%; vertical-align:top;"|

Archery

The United States has qualified the maximum team of three men and three women, for a total of six athletes.

Men

Women

Athletics (track and field)

Men
Track & road events

Key: Q=Qualified for next round based on position in heat; q=Qualified for next round as fastest loser; *=Athlete ran in a preliminary round but not the final

Field events

Key: Q=Qualify for final based on position in group; q=Qualify for final based on position in field without meeting qualifying mark

Combined event – Decathlon

Women
Track & road events

Key: Q=Qualified for next round based on position in heat; q=Qualified for next round as fastest loser; *=Athlete ran in a preliminary round but not the final

Field events

Key: Q=Qualify for final based on position in group; q=Qualify for final based on position in field without meeting qualifying mark

Combined event – Heptathlon

Badminton

The United States has qualified a full team of eight athletes.

Men

Women

Mixed

Baseball

The United States has qualified a men's baseball team, of 24 athletes. The United States will also enter a women's team of 18 athletes, for a total of 42 entered competitors.

Men's tournament

Group A

Semifinal

Gold medal game

Women's tournament

Group A

Gold medal game

Basketball

The United States has qualified a men's and women's teams. Each team will consist of 12 athletes, for a total of 24.

Men's tournament

Group A

Semifinal

Bronze medal game

Women's tournament

Group A

Semifinal

Gold medal game

Bowling

The United States has qualified a full team of 2 men and 2 women.

Boxing

The United States qualified boxers in every weight category except men's heavyweight and women's lightweight.

Men

Women

Canoeing

Slalom
The United States has qualified the following boats:

Sprint
United States has qualified 7 athletes in the sprint discipline (3 in men's kayak and 4 in women's kayak). The country has also received one wildcard in women's canoe.

Men

Women

Qualification Legend: QF = Qualify to final; QS = Qualify to semifinal

Cycling

U.S cyclists qualified for the following events

Road

Track
Sprint

Pursuit

Keirin

Omnium

Mountain biking

BMX

Diving

U.S. divers qualified for eight individual diving spots at the 2015 Pan American Games. These divers also made up the synchronized diving teams for each discipline.

Men

Women

Equestrian

U.S. equestrians qualified teams in dressage, eventing and jumping competitions.

They have also qualified four athletes in the individual dressage competition.

Dressage

Eventing

Jumping

Fencing

The United States has qualified 18 fencers (9 men, 9 women).

Men

Women

Field hockey

The United States has qualified both a men's and women's teams, for a total of 32 athletes (16 men and 16 women).

Men's tournament

Pool A

Quarterfinal

5th-8th classification

5th place game

Women's tournament

Pool B

Quarterfinal

Semifinal

Gold medal game

Golf

The U.S. qualified a full team of two female and two male golfers.

Gymnastics

Artistic
The United States qualified 10 athletes.

Men
Team & Individual Qualification

Individual finals

Women
Team & Individual Qualification

Individual finals

Rhythmic

The United States has qualified a full team of eight gymnasts (six in group and two in individual).

Individual

Qualification Legend: Q = Qualified to apparatus final

Group

Qualification Legend: Q = Qualified to apparatus final

Trampoline

The United States has qualified 4 athletes.

Judo

The United States has qualified a team of twelve judokas (six men and six women).

Men

Women

Karate

The United States has qualified 7 athletes.

Men

Women

Modern pentathlon

United States has qualified a team of 4 athletes (2 men and 2 women).

Racquetball

The United States has qualified a team of four men and two women for a total of six athletes. The US Team named seven athletes - four men and three women - to the team. The team was allowed an extra woman athlete, as teams that qualified ahead of the USA are not using all their qualifying spots.

Men

Women

Roller sports

The U.S. qualified three male and three female roller skaters.

Track skating

Figure skating

Rowing

The United States has qualified 14 boats.

Men

Women

Qualification Legend: FA=Final A (medal); FB=Final B (non-medal); R=Repechage

Rugby sevens

The United States has qualified a men's and women's teams for a total of 24 athletes (12 men and 12 women).

Men's tournament

Group A

Quarter-final

Semi-final

Bronze medal game

Women's tournament

Gold medal game

Sailing

The United States qualified 9 boats.

Men

Women

Open

Shooting

The United States has qualified a full quota of 25 shooters.

Men

Match shooting

Qualification key: Q=Qualified for semifinal; QB=Qualified for bronze medal match; QG=Qualified for gold medal match

Women

Match shooting

Qualification key: Q=Qualified for semifinal; QB=Qualified for bronze medal match; QG=Qualified for gold medal match

Softball

The United States has qualified both a men's and women's teams. Each team will consist of 15 athletes for a total of 30.

Men's tournament

Group A

Semifinal

Women's tournament

Group A

Semifinal

Gold medal game

Squash

The United States has qualified the maximum team of three men and three women, for a total of six athletes. The team was named on March 26, 2015.

Men

Team

Women

Team

Swimming

The United States swimming team will consist of 36 athletes (18 male and 18 female), which is the maximum a nation may enter. The roster was officially named on October 30, 2014.

Men

Qualification Legend: FA=Final A (medal); FB=Final B (non-medal)

Women

Qualification Legend: FA=Final A (medal); FB=Final B (non-medal)

Synchronized swimming

United States has qualified a full team of eight athletes.

Table tennis

The United States has qualified a men's and women's team.

Men

Women

Taekwondo

The United States has qualified a full team of eight athletes (four men and four women).

Men

Women

Tennis

The U.S. qualified three male and three female tennis players to compete in the tournament.

Men

Women

Mixed

Triathlon

The U.S. qualified the maximum of three men and three women for the triathlon event.

Volleyball

Beach

The United States has qualified a men's and women's pair for a total of four athletes.

Indoor

The United States has qualified a men's and women's volleyball team, for a total of 24 athletes (12 men and 12 women).

Men's tournament

Team

Standings

Results

Quarterfinal

Fifth-place game

Women's tournament

Team

Standings

Results

|}

Quarterfinals

|}

Gold medal match

|}

Water polo

The United States has qualified a men's and women's teams. Each team will consist of 13 athletes, for a total of 26.

Men's tournament

Pool A

Semifinal

Gold medal game

Women's tournament

Pool A

Semifinal

Gold medal game

Water skiing

The United States qualified four water skiers and one wakeboarder.

Men

Women

Weightlifting

The United States has qualified a team of 5 athletes (3 men and 2 women).

Wrestling

The United States qualified wrestlers in every event except the women's 58 kg and 69 kg weight classes.

Men's freestyle

Key: VT=Victory by fall; VF=Victory by forfeit; ST=Victory by great superiority; SP=Victory by technical superiority; PP=Victory by points, loser with technical points; PO=Victory by points, loser without technical points

Men's Greco-Roman

Key: VT=Victory by fall; VF=Victory by forfeit; ST=Victory by great superiority; SP=Victory by technical superiority; PP=Victory by points, loser with technical points; PO=Victory by points, loser without technical points

Women's freestyle

Key: VT=Victory by fall; VB=Victory by injury; ST=Victory by great superiority; SP=Victory by technical superiority; PP=Victory by points, loser with technical points; PO=Victory by points, loser without technical points

See also
United States at the 2016 Summer Olympics

References

Nations at the 2015 Pan American Games
2015
2015 in American sports